Sophie's Misfortunes is a 2016 French film written and directed by Christophe Honoré, based on the 1858 novel Sophie's Misfortunes by the Countess of Ségur.

Plot
Since her castle, the little Sophie can not resist the temptation of the forbidden and what she loves most is to do stupid things with her cousin Paul. When her parents decide to join America, Sophie is delighted. A year later, she is back in France with her horrible stepmother, Mrs. Fichini. But Sophie is going to count on the help of her two friends, the little girls and their mother, Madame de Fleurville to escape the clutches of that woman.

Cast
 Caroline Grant as Sophie de Réan
 Anaïs Demoustier as Madame de Fleurville
 Golshifteh Farahani as Madame Èvelyne de Réan
 Muriel Robin as Madame Fédora Fichini
 Michel Fau as Father Huc
 Céleste Carrale as Camille de Fleurville
 Aélys Le Nevé as Marguerite de Rosbourg
 Marlene Saldana as Madame Chantal de Rosbourg
 Jean-Charles Clichet as Baptistin
 David Prat as Joseph
 Lætitia Dosch as Noémie
 Tristan Farge as Paul d'Aubert
 Elsa Lepoivre as Madame Florence d'Auber
 Antoine Reinartz

Production
Filming began on 12 January 2015; the second part of this shoot was completed in summer 2015.

References

External links
 

2016 films
2010s French-language films
2016 comedy-drama films
French comedy-drama films
Films based on children's books
Gaumont Film Company films
Films directed by Christophe Honoré
2010s French films